Segovia Cathedral is the Gothic-style Roman Catholic cathedral located in the main square (Plaza Mayor) of the city of Segovia, in the community of Castile-Leon, Spain. The church, dedicated to the Virgin Mary, was built in the Flamboyant Gothic style in the mid-16th century.

History
The massive cathedral was built between 1525 and 1577 in a late Gothic style, outdated elsewhere in Europe. The previous cathedral of Segovia had stood adjacent to the Alcazar, and had been used by the royal armies in defending the latter against siege.  The rebellious Comuneros were intent on taking the cathedral to protect its holy relics, and to use its position against the walls of the Alcazar in order to defeat its defenders. In a famous exchange, prominent city officials urged the comuneros to halt their attacks on the church, saying they should consider the injustice of razing so sumptuous a temple while making war against those who, serving their king, defended his Alcazar. But their plea fell on deaf ears, and the comuneros replied:
la Iglesia era de la Ciudad (the Church belonged to the City). After a bitter siege lasting months, the cathedral lay in ruins.

Due to fears of a repeat assault, the cathedral was relocated to the present site and built using a design by the Trasmeran mason named Juan Gil de Hontañón, and the work was continued by his son Rodrigo Gil de Hontañón.

The building's structure features three tall vaults and an ambulatory, with fine tracery windows and numerous stained glass windows. The interior is characterized by unity of style (late Gothic), except for the dome, built around 1630 by Pedro de Brizuela.  The Gothic vaults are 33 meters high by 50 meters wide and 105 long. The bell tower reaches almost 90 meters. The current stone spire crowning the tower, dating from 1614, was erected after a major fire caused by a thunderstorm. The original spire, entirely Gothic, was built of American mahogany, had a pyramidal structure, and was the tallest tower in Spain.

Among the most prominent chapels are that of the Santísimo Sacramento, with a Reredo by José de Churriguera, the Chapel of San Andrés, with a Triptych of the Deposition by Ambrosius Benson, the Chapel of Piety with the Entombment by Juan de Juni; and the chapel of the Deposition with the recumbent Christ by Gregorio Fernández. 

The retablo mayor, or main reredos, of the cathedral was carved by Francisco Sabatini, and is dedicated to the Virgin of the Peace. It is adorned with the Segovian Saints Frutos, Geroteo, Valentín and Engracia. The choir has gothic seating.

The cathedral museum has works by Pedro Berruguete, Sánchez Coello and  Van Orley, and the cathedral archives have one of the first printed books published in Spain:  the Sinodal de Aguilafuente.

North nave
Capilla de San Andrés Apóstol
Capilla de San Cosme y San Damián
Capilla de San Gregorio
Capilla de la Concepción

South nave
Capilla del Cristo Yacente (Reclining Christ)
Capilla de Santa Bárbara
Capilla de Santiago Apóstol
Capilla del Cristo del Consuelo

Burials
Crescentius of Rome
Saint Fructus (d. 715), and his siblings Saint Valentine (Valentín) and Saint Engratia (Engracia).

See also
Roman Catholic Diocese of Segovia

Notes

External links
Official Website

Roman Catholic churches completed in 1577
16th-century Roman Catholic church buildings in Spain
Gothic architecture in Castile and León
Roman Catholic cathedrals in Castile and León
Cathedral
Church buildings with domes
Flamboyant Gothic